
This is an almanac-like listing of major Jewish holidays from 2000 to 2050. All Jewish holidays begin at sunset on the evening before the date shown.  On holidays marked "*", Jews are not permitted to work. Because the Hebrew calendar is governed by precise mathematical rules and no longer relies at all on observation, it is possible to provide the date in the Gregorian calendar that a holiday will fall on for the future.

5760s (2000s)

5760 (1999–2000)
Saturday, September 11: Rosh HaShanah*
Monday, September 20: Yom Kippur*
Saturday, September 25: Sukkot*
Saturday, October 2: Shemini Atzeret*
Sunday, October 3: Simchat Torah*
Saturday, December 4: Hanukkah
Saturday, January 22: Tu Bishvat
Tuesday, March 21: Purim
Wednesday, March 22: Shushan Purim
Thursday, April 20: Pesach*
Tuesday, May 2: Yom HaShoah
Tuesday, May 9: Yom HaZikaron
Wednesday, May 10: Yom Ha'atzmaut
Tuesday, May 23: Lag B'Omer
Friday, June 2: Yom Yerushalayim
Friday, June 9: Shavuot*
Thursday, July 20: Tzom Tammuz
Thursday, August 10: Tisha B'Av
Wednesday, August 16: Tu B'Av

5761 (2000–2001)
Saturday, September 30: Rosh HaShanah*
Monday, October 9: Yom Kippur*
Saturday, October 14: Sukkot*
Saturday, October 21: Shemini Atzeret*
Sunday, October 22: Simchat Torah*
Friday, December 22: Hanukkah
Thursday, February 8: Tu Bishvat
Friday, March 9: Purim
Sunday, March 11: Shushan Purim
Sunday, April 8: Pesach*
Thursday, April 19: Yom HaShoah
Wednesday, April 25: Yom HaZikaron
Thursday, April 26: Yom Ha'atzmaut
Friday, May 11: Lag B'Omer
Monday, May 21: Yom Yerushalayim
Monday, May 28: Shavuot*
Sunday, July 8: Tzom Tammuz
Sunday, July 29: Tisha B'Av
Saturday, August 4: Tu B'Av

5762 (2001–2002)
Tuesday, September 18: Rosh HaShanah*
Thursday, September 27: Yom Kippur*
Tuesday, October 2: Sukkot*
Tuesday, October 9: Shemini Atzeret*
Wednesday, October 10: Simchat Torah*
Monday, December 10: Hanukkah
Monday, January 28: Tu Bishvat
Tuesday, February 26: Purim
Wednesday, February 27: Shushan Purim
Thursday, March 28: Pesach*
Tuesday, April 9: Yom Ha'Shoah
Wednesday, April 17: Yom Ha'atzmaut
Tuesday, April 30: Lag Ba'omer
Friday, May 17: Shavuot*
Thursday, July 18: Tisha B'Av

5763 (2002–2003)
Saturday, September 7: Rosh HaShanah*
Monday, September 16: Yom Kippur*
Saturday, September 21: Sukkot*
Saturday, September 28: Shemini Atzeret*
Sunday, September 29: Simchat Torah*
Saturday, November 30: Hanukkah
Saturday, January 18: Tu Bishvat
Tuesday, March 18: Purim
Wednesday, March 19: Shushan Purim
Thursday, April 17: Pesach*
Tuesday, April 29: Yom Ha'Shoah
Wednesday, May 7: Yom Ha'atzmaut
Tuesday, May 20: Lag Ba'omer
Friday, June 6: Shavuot*
Thursday, August 7: Tisha B'Av

5764 (2003–2004)
Saturday, September 27: Rosh HaShanah*
Monday, October 6: Yom Kippur*
Saturday, October 11: Sukkot*
Saturday, October 18: Shemini Atzeret*
Sunday, October 19: Simchat Torah*
Saturday, December 20: Hanukkah
Saturday, February 7: Tu Bishvat
Sunday, March 7: Purim
Monday, March 8: Shushan Purim
Tuesday, April 6: Pesach*
Monday, April 19: Yom Ha'Shoah
Tuesday, April 27: Yom Ha'atzmaut
Sunday, May 9: Lag Ba'omer
Wednesday, May 26: Shavuot*
Tuesday, July 27: Tisha B'Av

5765 (2004–2005)
Thursday, September 16: Rosh HaShanah*
Saturday, September 25: Yom Kippur*
Thursday, September 30: Sukkot*
Thursday, October 7: Shemini Atzeret*
Friday, October 8: Simchat Torah*
Wednesday, December 8: Hanukkah
Tuesday, January 25: Tu Bishvat
Friday, March 25: Purim
Sunday, March 27: Shushan Purim
Sunday, April 24: Pesach*
Thursday, May 5: Yom Ha'Shoah
Thursday, May 12: Yom Ha'atzmaut
Friday, May 27: Lag Ba'omer
Monday, June 13: Shavuot*
Sunday, August 14: Tisha B'Av

5766 (2005–2006)
Tuesday, October 4: Rosh HaShanah*
Thursday, October 13: Yom Kippur*
Tuesday, October 18: Sukkot*
Tuesday, October 25: Shemini Atzeret*
Wednesday, October 26: Simchat Torah*
Monday, December 26: Hanukkah
Monday, February 13: Tu Bishvat
Tuesday, March 14: Purim
Wedesday, March 15: Shushan Purim
Thursday, April 13: Pesach*
Tuesday, April 25: Yom Ha'Shoah
Wednesday, May 3: Yom Ha'atzmaut
Tuesday, May 16: Lag Ba'omer
Friday, June 2: Shavuot*
Thursday, August 3: Tisha B'Av

5767 (2006–2007)
Saturday, September 23: Rosh HaShanah*
Monday, October 2: Yom Kippur*
Saturday, October 7: Sukkot*
Saturday, October 14: Shemini Atzeret*
Sunday, October 15: Simchat Torah*
Saturday, December 16: Hanukkah
Saturday, February 3: Tu Bishvat
Sunday, March 4: Purim
Monday, March 5: Shushan Purim
Tuesday, April 3: Pesach*
Monday, April 16: Yom Ha'Shoah
Tuesday, April 24: Yom Ha'atzmaut
Sunday, May 6: Lag Ba'omer
Wednesday, May 23: Shavuot*
Tuesday, July 24: Tisha B'Av

5768 (2007–2008)
Thursday, September 13: Rosh HaShanah*
Saturday, September 22: Yom Kippur*
Thursday, September 27: Sukkot*
Thursday, October 4: Shemini Atzeret*
Friday, October 5: Simchat Torah*
Wednesday, December 5: Hanukkah
Tuesday, January 22: Tu Bishvat
Friday, March 21: Purim
Sunday, March 23: Shushan Purim
Sunday, April 20: Pesach*
Thursday, May 1: Yom Ha'Shoah
Thursday, May 8: Yom Ha'atzmaut
Friday, May 23: Lag Ba'omer
Monday, June 9: Shavuot*
Sunday, August 10: Tisha B'Av

5769 (2008–2009)
Tuesday, September 30: Rosh HaShanah*
Thursday, October 9: Yom Kippur*
Tuesday, October 14: Sukkot*
Tuesday, October 21: Shemini Atzeret*
Wednesday, October 22: Simchat Torah*
Monday, December 22: Hanukkah
Monday, February 9: Tu Bishvat
Tuesday, March 10: Purim
Wednesday, March 11: Shushan Purim
Thursday, April 9: Pesach*
Tuesday, April 21: Yom Ha'Shoah
Wednesday, April 29: Yom Ha'atzmaut
Tuesday, May 12: Lag Ba'omer
Friday, May 29: Shavuot*
Thursday, July 30: Tisha B'Av

5770s (2010s)

5770 (2009–2010)
Saturday, September 19: Rosh HaShanah*
Monday, September 28: Yom Kippur*
Saturday, October 3: Sukkot*
Saturday, October 10: Shemini Atzeret*
Sunday, October 11: Simchat Torah*
Saturday, December 12: Hanukkah
Saturday, January 30: Tu Bishvat
Sunday, February 28: Purim
Tuesday, March 30: Pesach*
Monday, April 12: Yom Ha'Shoah
Tuesday, April 20: Yom Ha'atzmaut
Sunday, May 2: Lag Ba'omer
Wednesday, May 19: Shavuot*
Tuesday, July 20: Tisha B'Av

5771 (2010–2011)
Thursday, September 9: Rosh HaShanah*
Saturday, September 18: Yom Kippur*
Thursday, September 23: Sukkot*
Thursday, September 30: Shemini Atzeret*
Friday, October 1: Simchat Torah*
Thursday, December 2: Hanukkah
Thursday, January 20: Tu Bishvat
Sunday, March 20: Purim
Tuesday, April 19: Pesach*
Monday, May 2: Yom Ha'Shoah
Tuesday, May 10: Yom Ha'atzmaut
Sunday, May 22: Lag Ba'omer
Wednesday, June 8: Shavuot*
Tuesday, August 9: Tisha B'Av

5772 (2011–2012)
Thursday, September 29: Rosh HaShanah*
Saturday, October 8: Yom Kippur*
Thursday, October 13: Sukkot*
Thursday, October 20: Shemini Atzeret*
Friday, October 21: Simchat Torah*
Wednesday, December 21: Hanukkah
Wednesday, February 8: Tu Bishvat
Thursday, March 8: Purim
Saturday, April 7: Pesach*
Thursday, April 19: Yom Ha'Shoah
Thursday, April 26: Yom Ha'atzmaut
Thursday, May 10: Lag Ba'omer
Sunday, May 27: Shavuot*
Sunday, July 29: Tisha B'Av (postponed)

5773 (2012–2013)
Monday, September 17: Rosh HaShanah*
Wednesday, September 26: Yom Kippur*
Monday, October 1: Sukkot*
Monday, October 8: Shemini Atzeret*
Tuesday, October 9: Simchat Torah*
Sunday, December 9: Hanukkah
Saturday, January 26: Tu Bishvat
Sunday, February 24: Purim
Tuesday, March 26: Pesach*
Monday, April 8: Yom Ha'Shoah
Tuesday, April 16: Yom Ha'atzmaut
Sunday, April 28: Lag Ba'omer
Wednesday, May 15: Shavuot*
Tuesday, July 16: Tisha B'Av

5774 (2013–2014)
Thursday, September 5: Rosh HaShanah*
Saturday, September 14: Yom Kippur*
Thursday, September 19: Sukkot*
Thursday, September 26: Shemini Atzeret*
Friday, September 27: Simchat Torah*
Thursday, November 28: Hanukkah
Thursday, January 16: Tu Bishvat
Sunday, March 16: Purim
Tuesday, April 15: Pesach*
Monday, April 28: Yom Ha'Shoah
Tuesday, May 6: Yom Ha'atzmaut
Sunday, May 18: Lag Ba'omer
Wednesday, June 4: Shavuot*
Tuesday, August 5: Tisha B'Av

5775 (2014–2015)
Thursday, September 25: Rosh HaShanah*
Saturday, October 4: Yom Kippur*
Thursday, October 9: Sukkot*
Thursday, October 16: Shemini Atzeret*
Friday, October 17: Simchat Torah*
Wednesday, December 17: Hanukkah
Wednesday, February 4: Tu Bishvat
Thursday, March 5: Purim
Saturday, April 4: Pesach*
Thursday, April 16: Yom Ha'Shoah
Thursday, April 23: Yom Ha'atzmaut
Thursday, May 7: Lag Ba'omer
Sunday, May 24: Shavuot*
Sunday, July 26: Tisha B'Av

5776 (2015–2016)
Monday, September 14: Rosh HaShanah*
Wednesday, September 23: Yom Kippur*
Monday, September 28: Sukkot*
Monday, October 5: Shemini Atzeret*
Tuesday, October 6: Simchat Torah*
Monday, December 7: Hanukkah
Monday, January 25: Tu Bishvat
Thursday, March 24: Purim
Saturday, April 23: Pesach*
Thursday, May 5: Yom Ha'Shoah
Thursday, May 12: Yom Ha'atzmaut
Thursday, May 26: Lag Ba'omer
Sunday, June 12: Shavuot*
Sunday, August 14: Tisha B'Av

5777 (2016–2017)
Monday, October 3: Rosh HaShanah*
Wednesday, October 12: Yom Kippur*
Monday, October 17: Sukkot*
Monday, October 24: Shemini Atzeret*
Tuesday, October 25: Simchat Torah*
Tuesday, November 8: Yom HaAliyah (school observance)
Sunday, December 25: Hanukkah
Saturday, February 11: Tu Bishvat
Sunday, March 12: Purim
Thursday, April 6: Yom HaAliyah
Tuesday, April 11: Pesach*
Monday, April 24: Yom Ha'Shoah
Tuesday, May 2: Yom Ha'atzmaut
Sunday, May 14: Lag Ba'omer
Wednesday, May 31: Shavuot*
Tuesday, August 1: Tisha B'Av

5778 (2017–2018)
Thursday, September 21: Rosh HaShanah*
Saturday, September 30: Yom Kippur*
Thursday, October 5: Sukkot*
Thursday, October 12: Shemini Atzeret*
Friday, October 13: Simchat Torah*
Friday, October 27: Yom HaAliyah (school observance)
Wednesday, December 13: Hanukkah
Wednesday, January 31: Tu Bishvat
Thursday, March 1: Purim
Monday, March 26: Yom HaAliyah
Saturday, March 31: Pesach*
Thursday, April 12: Yom Ha'Shoah
Thursday, April 19: Yom Ha'atzmaut
Thursday, May 3: Lag Ba'omer
Sunday, May 20: Shavuot*
Sunday, July 22: Tisha B'Av

5779 (2018–2019)
Monday, September 10: Rosh HaShanah*
Wednesday, September 19: Yom Kippur*
Monday, September 24: Sukkot*
Monday, October 1: Shemini Atzeret*
Tuesday, October 2: Simchat Torah*
Tuesday, October 16: Yom HaAliyah (school observance)
Monday, December 3: Hanukkah
Monday, January 21: Tu Bishvat
Thursday, March 21: Purim
Monday, April 15: Yom HaAliyah
Saturday, April 20: Pesach*
Thursday, May 2: Yom Ha'Shoah
Thursday, May 9: Yom Ha'atzmaut
Sunday, May 19: Pesach Sheni
Thursday, May 23: Lag Ba'omer
Sunday, June 9: Shavuot*
Sunday, August 11: Tisha B'Av

5780s (2020s)

5780 (2019–2020)
Monday, September 30: Rosh HaShanah*
Wednesday, October 9: Yom Kippur*
Monday, October 14: Sukkot*
Monday, October 21: Shemini Atzeret*
Tuesday, October 22: Simchat Torah*
Tuesday, November 5: Yom HaAliyah (school observance)
Monday, December 23: Hanukkah
Monday, February 10: Tu Bishvat
Tuesday, March 10: Purim
Saturday, April 4: Yom HaAliyah
Thursday, April 9: Pesach*
Tuesday, April 21: Yom Ha'Shoah
Wednesday, April 29: Yom Ha'atzmaut
Tuesday, May 12: Lag Ba'omer
Monday, May 25: Pesach Sheni
Friday, May 29: Shavuot*
Thursday, July 30: Tisha B'Av

5781 (2020–2021)
Saturday, September 19: Rosh HaShanah*
Monday, September 28: Yom Kippur*
Saturday, October 3: Sukkot*
Saturday, October 10: Shemini Atzeret*
Sunday, October 11: Simchat Torah*
Sunday, October 25: Yom HaAliyah (school observance)
Friday, December 11: Hanukkah
Thursday, January 28: Tu Bishvat
Friday, February 26: Purim
Tuesday, March 23: Yom HaAliyah
Sunday, March 28: Pesach*
Thursday, April 8: Yom Ha'Shoah
Thursday, April 15: Yom Ha'atzmaut
Friday, April 30: Lag Ba'omer
Monday, May 17: Shavuot*
Sunday, July 18: Tisha B'Av

5782 (2021–2022)
Tuesday, September 7: Rosh Hashanah*
Thursday, September 16: Yom Kippur*
Tuesday, September 21: Sukkot*
Tuesday, September 28: Shemini Atzeret*
Wednesday, September 29: Simchat Torah*
Wednesday, October 13: Yom HaAliyah (school observance)
Monday, November 29: Hanukkah
Monday, January 17: Tu Bishvat
Thursday, March 17: Purim
Monday, April 11: Yom HaAliyah
Saturday, April 16: Pesach*
Thursday, April 28: Yom Ha'Shoah
Thursday, May 5: Yom Ha'atzmaut
Thursday, May 19: Lag Ba'omer
Sunday, June 5: Shavuot*
Sunday, August 7: Tisha B'Av

5783 (2022–2023)
Monday, September 26: Rosh HaShanah*
Wednesday, October 5: Yom Kippur*
Monday, October 10: Sukkot*
Monday, October 17: Shemini Atzeret*
Tuesday, October 18: Simchat Torah*
Tuesday, November 1: Yom HaAliyah (school observance)
Monday, December 19: Hanukkah
Monday, February 6: Tu Bishvat
Tuesday, March 7: Purim
Saturday, April 1: Yom HaAliyah
Thursday, April 6: Pesach*
Tuesday, April 18: Yom Ha'Shoah
Wednesday, April 26: Yom Ha'atzmaut
Tuesday, May 9: Lag Ba'omer
Friday, May 26: Shavuot*
Thursday, July 27: Tisha B'Av

5784 (2023–2024)
Saturday, September 16: Rosh HaShanah*
Monday, September 25: Yom Kippur*
Saturday, September 30: Sukkot*
Saturday, October 7: Shemini Atzeret*
Sunday, October 8: Simchat Torah*
Sunday, October 22: Yom HaAliyah (school observance)
Friday, December 8: Hanukkah
Thursday, January 25: Tu Bishvat
Sunday, March 24: Purim
Thursday, April 18: Yom HaAliyah
Tuesday, April 23: Pesach*
Monday, May 6: Yom Ha'Shoah
Tuesday, May 14: Yom Ha'atzmaut
Sunday, May 26: Lag Ba'omer
Wednesday, June 12: Shavuot*
Tuesday, August 13: Tisha B'Av

5785 (2024–2025)
Thursday, October 3: Rosh HaShanah*
Saturday, October 12: Yom Kippur*
Thursday, October 17: Sukkot*
Thursday, October 24: Shemini Atzeret*
Friday, October 25: Simchat Torah*
Thursday, December 26: Hanukkah
Thursday, February 13: Tu Bishvat
Friday, March 14: Purim
Sunday, April 13: Pesach*
Thursday, April 24: Yom Ha'Shoah
Thursday, May 1: Yom Ha'atzmaut
Friday, May 16: Lag Ba'omer
Monday, June 2: Shavuot*
Sunday, August 3: Tisha B'Av

5786 (2025–2026)
Tuesday, September 23: Rosh HaShanah*
Thursday, October 2: Yom Kippur*
Tuesday, October 7: Sukkot*
Tuesday, October 14: Shemini Atzeret*
Wednesday, October 15: Simchat Torah*
Monday, December 15: Hanukkah
Monday, February 2: Tu Bishvat
Tuesday, March 3: Purim
Thursday, April 2: Pesach*
Tuesday, April 14: Yom Ha'Shoah
Wednesday, April 22: Yom Ha'atzmaut
Tuesday, May 5: Lag Ba'omer
Friday, May 22: Shavuot*
Thursday, July 23: Tisha B'Av

5787 (2026–2027)
Saturday, September 12: Rosh HaShanah*
Monday, September 21: Yom Kippur*
Saturday, September 26: Sukkot*
Saturday, October 3: Shemini Atzeret*
Sunday, October 4: Simchat Torah*
Saturday, December 5: Hanukkah
Saturday, January 23: Tu Bishvat
Tuesday, March 23: Purim
Thursday, April 22: Pesach*
Tuesday, May 4: Yom Ha'Shoah
Wednesday, May 12: Yom Ha'atzmaut
Tuesday, May 25: Lag Ba'omer
Friday, June 11: Shavuot*
Thursday, August 12: Tisha B'Av

5788 (2027–2028)
Saturday, October 2: Rosh HaShanah*
Monday, October 11: Yom Kippur*
Saturday, October 16: Sukkot*
Saturday, October 23: Shemini Atzeret*
Sunday, October 24: Simchat Torah*
Saturday, November 6: Yom HaAliyah (school observance)
Saturday, December 25: Hanukkah
Saturday, February 12: Tu Bishvat
Sunday, March 12: Purim
Tuesday, April 11: Pesach*
Monday, April 24: Yom Ha'Shoah
Tuesday, May 2: Yom Ha'atzmaut
Sunday, May 14: Lag Ba'omer
Wednesday, May 31: Shavuot*
Tuesday, August 1: Tisha B'Av

5789 (2028–2029)
Thursday, September 21: Rosh HaShanah*
Saturday, September 30: Yom Kippur*
Thursday, October 5: Sukkot*
Thursday, October 12: Shemini Atzeret*
Friday, October 13: Simchat Torah*
Wednesday, December 13: Hanukkah
Wednesday, January 31: Tu Bishvat
Thursday, March 1: Purim
Saturday, March 31: Pesach*
Thursday, April 12: Yom Ha'Shoah
Thursday, April 19: Yom Ha'atzmaut
Thursday, May 3: Lag Ba'omer
Sunday, May 20: Shavuot*
Sunday, July 22: Tisha B'Av

5790s (2030s)

5790 (2029–2030)
Monday, September 10: Rosh HaShanah*
Wednesday, September 19: Yom Kippur*
Monday, September 24: Sukkot*
Monday, October 1: Shemini Atzeret*
Tuesday, October 2: Simchat Torah*
Sunday, December 2: Hanukkah
Saturday, January 19: Tu Bishvat
Tuesday, March 19: Purim
Thursday, April 18: Pesach*
Tuesday, April 30: Yom Ha'Shoah
Wednesday, May 8: Yom Ha'atzmaut
Tuesday, May 21: Lag Ba'omer
Friday, June 7: Shavuot*
Thursday, August 8: Tisha B'Av

5791 (2030–2031)
Saturday, September 28: Rosh HaShanah*
Monday, October 7: Yom Kippur*
Saturday, October 12: Sukkot*
Saturday, October 19: Shemini Atzeret*
Sunday, October 20: Simchat Torah*
Saturday, December 21: Hanukkah
Saturday, February 8: Tu Bishvat
Sunday, March 9: Purim
Tuesday, April 8: Pesach*
Monday, April 21: Yom Ha'Shoah
Tuesday, April 29: Yom Ha'atzmaut
Sunday, May 11: Lag Ba'omer
Wednesday, May 28: Shavuot*
Tuesday, July 29: Tisha B'Av

5792 (2031–2032)
Thursday, September 18: Rosh HaShanah*
Saturday, September 27: Yom Kippur*
Thursday, October 2: Sukkot*
Thursday, October 9: Shemini Atzeret*
Friday, October 10: Simchat Torah*
Wednesday, December 10: Hanukkah
Wednesday, January 28: Tu Bishvat
Thursday, February 26: Purim
Saturday, March 27: Pesach*
Thursday, April 8: Yom Ha'Shoah
Thursday, April 15: Yom Ha'atzmaut
Thursday, April 29: Lag Ba'omer
Sunday, May 16: Shavuot*
Sunday, July 18: Tisha B'Av

5793 (2032–2033)
Monday, September 6: Rosh HaShanah*
Wednesday, September 15: Yom Kippur*
Monday, September 20: Sukkot*
Monday, September 27: Shemini Atzeret*
Tuesday, September 28: Simchat Torah*
Sunday, November 28: Hanukkah
Saturday, January 15: Tu Bishvat
Tuesday, March 15: Purim
Thursday, April 14: Pesach*
Tuesday, April 26: Yom Ha'Shoah
Wednesday, May 4: Yom Ha'atzmaut
Tuesday, May 17: Lag Ba'omer
Friday, June 3: Shavuot*
Thursday, August 4: Tisha B'Av

5794 (2033–2034)
Saturday, September 24: Rosh HaShanah*
Monday, October 3: Yom Kippur*
Saturday, October 8: Sukkot*
Saturday, October 15: Shemini Atzeret*
Sunday, October 16: Simchat Torah*
Saturday, December 17: Hanukkah
Saturday, February 4: Tu Bishvat
Sunday, March 5: Purim
Tuesday, April 4: Pesach*
Monday, April 17: Yom Ha'Shoah
Tuesday, April 25: Yom Ha'atzmaut
Sunday, May 7: Lag Ba'omer
Wednesday, May 24: Shavuot*
Tuesday, July 25: Tisha B'Av

5795 (2034–2035)
Thursday, September 14: Rosh HaShanah*
Saturday, September 23: Yom Kippur*
Thursday, September 28: Sukkot*
Thursday, October 5: Shemini Atzeret*
Friday, October 6: Simchat Torah*
Thursday, December 7: Hanukkah
Thursday, January 25: Tu Bishvat
Sunday, March 25: Purim
Tuesday, April 24: Pesach*
Monday, May 7: Yom Ha'Shoah
Tuesday, May 15: Yom Ha'atzmaut
Sunday, May 27: Lag Ba'omer
Wednesday, June 13: Shavuot*
Tuesday, August 14: Tisha B'Av

5796 (2035–2036)
Thursday, October 4: Rosh HaShanah*
Saturday, October 13: Yom Kippur*
Thursday, October 18: Sukkot*
Thursday, October 25: Shemini Atzeret*
Friday, October 26: Simchat Torah*
Wednesday, December 26: Hanukkah
Wednesday, February 13: Tu Bishvat
Thursday, March 13: Purim
Saturday, April 12: Pesach*
Thursday, April 24: Yom Ha'Shoah
Thursday, May 1: Yom Ha'atzmaut
Thursday, May 15: Lag Ba'omer
Sunday, June 1: Shavuot*
Sunday, August 3: Tisha B'Av

5797 (2036–2037)
Monday, September 22: Rosh HaShanah*
Wednesday, October 1: Yom Kippur*
Monday, October 6: Sukkot*
Monday, October 13: Shemini Atzeret*
Tuesday, October 14: Simchat Torah*
Sunday, December 14: Hanukkah
Saturday, January 31: Tu Bishvat
Sunday, March 1: Purim
Tuesday, March 31: Pesach*
Monday, April 13: Yom Ha'Shoah
Tuesday, April 21: Yom Ha'atzmaut
Sunday, May 3: Lag Ba'omer
Wednesday, May 20: Shavuot*
Tuesday, July 21: Tisha B'Av

5798 (2037–2038)
Thursday, September 10: Rosh HaShanah*
Saturday, September 19: Yom Kippur*
Thursday, September 24: Sukkot*
Thursday, October 1: Shemini Atzeret*
Friday, October 2: Simchat Torah*
Thursday, December 3: Hanukkah
Thursday, January 21: Tu Bishvat
Sunday, March 21: Purim
Tuesday, April 20: Pesach*
Monday, May 3: Yom Ha'Shoah
Tuesday, May 11: Yom Ha'atzmaut
Sunday, May 23: Lag Ba'omer
Wednesday, June 9: Shavuot*
Tuesday, August 10: Tisha B'Av

5799 (2038–2039)
Thursday, September 30: Rosh HaShanah*
Saturday, October 9: Yom Kippur*
Thursday, October 14: Sukkot*
Thursday, October 21: Shemini Atzeret*
Friday, October 22: Simchat Torah*
Wednesday, December 22: Hanukkah
Wednesday, February 9: Tu Bishvat
Thursday, March 10: Purim
Saturday, April 9: Pesach*
Thursday, April 21: Yom Ha'Shoah
Thursday, April 28: Yom Ha'atzmaut
Thursday, May 12: Lag Ba'omer
Sunday, May 29: Shavuot*
Sunday, July 31: Tisha B'Av

5800s (2040s)

5800 (2039–2040)
Monday, September 19: Rosh HaShanah*
Wednesday, September 28: Yom Kippur*
Monday, October 3: Sukkot*
Monday, October 10: Shemini Atzeret*
Tuesday, October 11: Simchat Torah*
Monday, December 12: Hanukkah
Monday, January 30: Tu Bishvat
Tuesday, February 28: Purim
Thursday, March 29: Pesach*
Tuesday, April 10: Yom Ha'Shoah
Wednesday, April 18: Yom Ha'atzmaut
Tuesday, May 1: Lag Ba'omer
Friday, May 18: Shavuot*
Thursday, July 19: Tisha B'Av

5801 (2040–2041)
Saturday, September 8: Rosh HaShanah*
Monday, September 17: Yom Kippur*
Saturday, September 22: Sukkot*
Saturday, September 29: Shemini Atzeret*
Sunday, September 30: Simchat Torah*
Friday, November 30: Hanukkah
Thursday, January 17: Tu Bishvat
Sunday, March 17: Purim
Tuesday, April 16: Pesach*
Monday, April 29: Yom Ha'Shoah
Tuesday, May 7: Yom Ha'atzmaut
Sunday, May 19: Lag Ba'omer
Wednesday, June 5: Shavuot*
Tuesday, August 6: Tisha B'Av

5802 (2041–2042)
Thursday, September 26: Rosh HaShanah*
Saturday, October 5: Yom Kippur*
Thursday, October 10: Sukkot*
Thursday, October 17: Shemini Atzeret*
Friday, October 18: Simchat Torah*
Wednesday, December 18: Hanukkah
Wednesday, February 5: Tu Bishvat
Thursday, March 6: Purim
Saturday, April 5: Pesach*
Thursday, April 17: Yom Ha'Shoah
Thursday, April 24: Yom Ha'atzmaut
Thursday, May 8: Lag Ba'omer
Sunday, May 25: Shavuot*
Sunday, July 27: Tisha B'Av

5803 (2042–2043)
Monday, September 15: Rosh HaShanah*
Wednesday, September 24: Yom Kippur*
Monday, September 29: Sukkot*
Monday, October 6: Shemini Atzeret*
Tuesday, October 7: Simchat Torah*
Monday, December 8: Hanukkah
Monday, January 26: Tu Bishvat
Thursday, March 26: Purim
Saturday, April 25: Pesach*
Thursday, May 7: Yom Ha'Shoah
Thursday, May 14: Yom Ha'atzmaut
Thursday, May 28: Lag Ba'omer
Sunday, June 14: Shavuot*
Sunday, August 16: Tisha B'Av

5804 (2043–2044)
Monday, October 5: Rosh HaShanah*
Wednesday, October 14: Yom Kippur*
Monday, October 19: Sukkot*
Monday, October 26: Shemini Atzeret*
Tuesday, October 27: Simchat Torah*
Sunday, December 27: Hanukkah
Saturday, February 13: Tu Bishvat
Sunday, March 13: Purim
Tuesday, April 12: Pesach*
Monday, April 25: Yom Ha'Shoah
Tuesday, May 3: Yom Ha'atzmaut
Sunday, May 15: Lag Ba'omer
Wednesday, June 1: Shavuot*
Tuesday, August 2: Tisha B'Av

5805 (2044–2045)
Thursday, September 22: Rosh HaShanah*
Saturday, October 1: Yom Kippur*
Thursday, October 6: Sukkot*
Thursday, October 13: Shemini Atzeret*
Friday, October 14: Simchat Torah*
Thursday, December 15: Hanukkah
Thursday, February 2: Tu Bishvat
Friday, March 3: Purim
Sunday, April 2: Pesach*
Thursday, April 13: Yom Ha'Shoah
Thursday, April 20: Yom Ha'atzmaut
Friday, May 5: Lag Ba'omer
Monday, May 22: Shavuot*
Sunday, July 23: Tisha B'Av

5806 (2045–2046)
Tuesday, September 12: Rosh HaShanah*
Thursday, September 21: Yom Kippur*
Tuesday, September 26: Sukkot*
Tuesday, October 3: Shemini Atzeret*
Wednesday, October 4: Simchat Torah*
Monday, December 4: Hanukkah
Monday, January 22: Tu Bishvat
Thursday, March 22: Purim
Saturday, April 21: Pesach*
Thursday, May 3: Yom Ha'Shoah
Thursday, May 10: Yom Ha'atzmaut
Thursday, May 24: Lag Ba'omer
Sunday, June 10: Shavuot*
Sunday, August 12: Tisha B'Av

5807 (2046–2047)
Monday, October 1: Rosh HaShanah*
Wednesday, October 10: Yom Kippur*
Monday, October 15: Sukkot*
Monday, October 22: Shemini Atzeret*
Tuesday, October 23: Simchat Torah*
Monday, December 24: Hanukkah
Monday, February 11: Tu Bishvat
Tuesday, March 12: Purim
Thursday, April 11: Pesach*
Tuesday, April 23: Yom Ha'Shoah
Wednesday, May 1: Yom Ha'atzmaut
Tuesday, May 14: Lag Ba'omer
Friday, May 31: Shavuot*
Thursday, August 1: Tisha B'Av

5808 (2047–2048)
Saturday, September 21: Rosh HaShanah*
Monday, September 30: Yom Kippur*
Saturday, October 5: Sukkot*
Saturday, October 12: Shemini Atzeret*
Sunday, October 13: Simchat Torah*
Friday, December 13: Hanukkah
Thursday, January 30: Tu Bishvat
Friday, February 28: Purim
Sunday, March 29: Pesach*
Thursday, April 9: Yom Ha'Shoah
Thursday, April 16: Yom Ha'atzmaut
Friday, May 1: Lag Ba'omer
Monday, May 18: Shavuot*
Sunday, July 19: Tisha B'Av

5809 (2048–2049)
Tuesday, September 8: Rosh HaShanah*
Thursday, September 17: Yom Kippur*
Tuesday, September 22: Sukkot*
Tuesday, September 29: Shemini Atzeret*
Wednesday, September 30: Simchat Torah*
Monday, November 30: Hanukkah
Monday, January 18: Tu Bishvat
Thursday, March 18: Purim
Saturday, April 17: Pesach*
Thursday, April 29: Yom Ha'Shoah
Thursday, May 6: Yom Ha'atzmaut
Thursday, May 20: Lag Ba'omer
Sunday, June 6: Shavuot*
Sunday, August 8: Tisha B'Av

5810s (2050s)

5810 (2049–2050)
Monday, September 27: Rosh HaShanah*
Wednesday, October 6: Yom Kippur*
Monday, October 11: Sukkot*
Monday, October 18: Shemini Atzeret*
Tuesday, October 19: Simchat Torah*
Monday, December 20: Hanukkah
Monday, February 7: Tu Bishvat
Tuesday, March 8: Purim
Wednesday, March 9: Shushan Purim
Thursday, April 7: Pesach*
Tuesday, April 19: Yom HaShoah
Tuesday, April 26: Yom HaZikaron
Wednesday, April 27: Yom Ha'atzmaut
Tuesday, May 10: Lag B'Omer
Friday, May 20: Yom Yerushalayim
Friday, May 27: Shavuot*
Thursday, July 7: Tzom Tammuz
Thursday, July 28: Tisha B'Av
Wednesday, August 3: Tu B'Av

5811 (2050)
Saturday, September 17: Rosh HaShanah*
Monday, September 26: Yom Kippur*
Saturday, October 1: Sukkot*
Saturday, October 8: Shemini Atzeret*
Sunday, October 9: Simchat Torah*
Saturday, December 10: Hanukkah

See also
Hebrew calendar

External links
Hebcal.com: Hebrew Calendars & Hebrew Date Converter